"Cynthia" was a mannequin created in 1932 by Lester Gaba, a sculptor, retail display designer and later a teacher and writer. An unusually natural and human-looking mannequin, Gaba used the attention Cynthia garnered to further anthropomorphize her.  As a result, Gaba and Cynthia became famous, with Gaba becoming known for his mannequins, and with Cynthia appearing on the cover of Life magazine, and being invited to the wedding of the former Edward VIII and Wallis Simpson in 1937. Gaba's development of lighter-weight mannequins, with more natural, human features, along with Cynthia's popularity impacted the use of mannequins in retail sales marketing.

History 
In 1932, artist Lester Gaba created Cynthia for Saks Fifth Avenue, a  plaster model who, unusually, had realistic human imperfections like freckles, pigeon toes, and even different sized feet. 

Gaba posed with Cynthia around New York City for a Life magazine shoot, and Cynthia appeared on the cover of the magazine, humorously demonstrating how life-like mannequins had become. Gaba further anthropomorphized Cynthia, and she began to receive invitations, fan mail and gifts, and to attend events. Gaba insisted that Cynthia had laryngitis, to account for her lack of speech during personal appearances.

Additionally, a whole host of "Gaba Girls" were to follow. The Gaba Girls were life-sized, carved-soap mannequins modeled after well-known New York debutantes for the windows of Best & Company. With the Gaba Girls and their realistic successors’ appeal, mannequins became an important new tool used by sellers to attract their clientele.

Cynthia herself soon became dazzlingly famous. Cartier and Tiffany sent her jewelry, Lilly Daché designed hats for her, and couturiers sent her their latest fashions, furrieries sent minks. Cynthia began to receive large quantities of fan mail and was photographed by Alfred Eisenstaedt. She was given a credit card from Saks Fifth Avenue, and had a box seat subscription to the Metropolitan Opera House. She had her own newspaper column and a successful radio show. In 1938, she went to Hollywood to appear in the movie Artists and Models Abroad.  In 1939, she was back in New York to see the notorious play Madame Bovary at the Broadhurst Theater.

Cynthia met her demise when she slipped from a chair in a beauty salon and shattered. The press reported her death, and Gaba appeared distraught, but eventually reconstructed her. In December 1942, however, Gaba was inducted into the Army. Cynthia retired, and it wasn't until 1953 that she came back to the public in a TV show. But the magic was over, and Cynthia was soon to be stored in a cupboard for good.

References

Further reading
Radio 360: Mannequin Pixie Dream Girl
Leeander Scott: "Gabbing over Gaba"
"Gabbing over Gaba". by Leeander Scott 
"Lester Gaba: From Soap to Mannequins" by Janet Mabie

Dummies and mannequins
1932 sculptures
Sculptures of women in New York City
History of New York City
1930s in New York City
Performance art in New York City